LMP – Hungary's Green Party (Greens, between 2009 and 2020: Politics Can Be Different, LMP) is a green-liberal political party in Hungary. Founded in 2009, it was one of four parties to win seats in the National Assembly in the 2010 parliamentary election. The party is a member of the European Green Party. The party is political position has been specified as centrist, centre-left and left-wing.

History

Foundation and electoral success
The party was preceded by a non-governmental organization social initiative founded in 2008, with the purpose of reforming Hungarian politics. LMP shares common ideologies with most green parties. Key issues are environmental protection, sustainable development and the fight against corruption in the current political elite. LMP highlights what they see as the pointlessness of the current partisan division between the left and right-wing forces, and their principle is deliberative democracy, which they believe decreases the distance between the people and the political elite.

The public faces of the organization were András Schiffer, a former member of the Hungarian Civil Liberties Union (HCLU) and Védegylet, and Bernadett Szél, an economist and NGO worker at the party's formation. The leading figures also included Benedek Jávor, university professor in environmental law and a founder of Védegylet, Gábor Scheiring, an economist, and Tímea Szabó, a humanitarian worker, who was to head the list presented for the 2009 European Parliament elections. In 2009, LMP received the official endorsement of the European Green Party.

At the 2009 European Parliament elections the party garnered 75,522 votes, (or 2.61% of the total votes), which was less than the 5% needed to gain a seat for the 2009–2014 cycle, though beating the 2.16% received by Alliance of Free Democrats (SZDSZ), one of the parties already in the national parliament.

In the 2010 parliamentary elections, the party achieved 7.48% in the first electoral round, thereby clearing the 5 percent electoral threshold, gaining 16 seats in the parliament, though it did not obtain any direct-representational seats. In the local elections of 3 October 2010, LMP gained 54 seats in local city councils, with at least one representative in most of the district councils of the capital, three seats in the General Assembly of Budapest, as well as in a few other cities around the country. Gábor Ivády was the only party member to be elected mayor of a town; however he left LMP on 21 October 2010.

Since its establishment and 2010 national election, LMP was kept under pressure by the Hungarian Socialist Party (MSZP) to achieve some kind of electoral compromise and cooperation against Viktor Orbán's controversial government. For instance, during the by-election in the 2nd District of Budapest in 2011, MSZP urged the LMP's candidate Gergely Karácsony to withdraw in Katalin Lévai's favor, but the Green party did not do this. The leadership of the LMP positioned the party to the centre, and, as a newcomer, rejected both Fidesz and MSZP's politics. András Schiffer also criticized the previous Socialist cabinets, blaming Ferenc Gyurcsány's disastrous governance for having Fidesz won a two-thirds majority in 2010. However prominent politicians in LMP were divided on the issue of cooperation. In July 2011, Karácsony proposed an election coalition between Jobbik, LMP and MSZP, to change certain laws enacted by Fidesz. He cited Éva Tétényi's case, as a precedent of how such a proposal could work. Politics Can Be Different became a full member of the European Green Party (EGP) in November 2011.

Party split
During the party's congress in November 2012, LMP decided not to join Together 2014, the planned electoral alliance of opposition parties and movements led by Gordon Bajnai. As a result, Benedek Jávor, a proponent of the agreement, resigned from his position of parliamentary group leader. Jávor and his supporters (including Tímea Szabó and Gergely Karácsony) founded a platform within the party, called "Dialogue for Hungary" on 26 November 2012. The platform argued in favour of conclusion of an electoral agreement with Bajnai's movement to replace "Orbán's regime". Later that day Schiffer, who did not support the cooperation with Bajnai, was elected leader of the LMP parliamentary group for second time.

In January 2013, the LMP's congress rejected again the electoral cooperation with other opposition parties, including Together 2014. As a result, members of the party's "Dialogue for Hungary" platform left LMP to form a new political organization. Benedek Jávor announced the eight leaving MPs will not resign from their parliamentary seats. Seven parliamentarians remained in the party, Jávor said negotiations are required for the continued operation of the parliamentary group, according to the house rules, which requires 12 seats. Schiffer did not call the secession as a party split, because, he argued, less than 10% of the LMP's membership decided to leave the party and joined Jávor's new initiative. The leaving MPs established Dialogue for Hungary as an officially registered party in March 2013. After the failed negotiations, the eight MPs also left the parliamentary group which then broken up according to the house rules of the National Assembly.

Recovery
The 4K! – Fourth Republic! party offered electoral alliance to the LMP. Party leader András Istvánffy called the developments that took place in opposition as "a cleansing process, which will separate those who seek to restore pre-2010 conditions and those who want real regime change." However LMP refused the 4K! party's cooperation offer in September 2013.

Schiffer and Bernadett Szél were elected co-presidents of the LMP during the party's congress on 24 March 2013. The seven MPs of the party were able to re-establish the LMP's caucus on 1 September 2013, after the decision of the Committee on Immunity, Incompatibility and Mandate. The old-new group became the first caucus, where the majority were women, for the first time in Hungary.

Politics Can Be Different received five seats, as it barely jumped over the 5% threshold in the 2014 parliamentary election. The party reached the same result in the 2014 European Parliament election, when it received 5.04% of the votes and sent one representative to the European Parliament. MEP Tamás Meszerics joined The Greens–European Free Alliance (Greens/EFA). In August 2014, LMP and 4K! agreed to a cooperation in some electoral districts in Budapest during the 2014 local elections. The candidate for Budapest mayor, Antal Csárdi, took just fourth place after István Tarlós, Lajos Bokros and Gábor Staudt. The party collected fewer votes with 50,000 than results of four years ago in the whole country. Virtually LMP remained a metropolitan organization, with only an insignificant representation in the countryside. In a different point of view, LMP largely regained the positions, which had been lost during the party split in early 2013, for instance, then all three representatives in the General Assembly of Budapest joined Dialogue for Hungary.

On 18 July 2015, Schiffer and Szél were re-elected co-presidents of the party. Ákos Hadházy, a former Fidesz member, who revealed the government's tobacco shop corruption scandal, was also elected to the LMP's leadership. The party's most well-known politician, Schiffer announced his retirement from politics on 31 May 2016. After the resignation of Erzsébet Schmuck, Szél was elected leader of the LMP parliamentary group on 16 February 2017. In September 2017, Bernadett Szél was nominated the party's candidate to the position of prime minister for the upcoming parliamentary election. In the same month, former socialist MP Márta Demeter joined the LMP's parliamentary group, but she is not member of the party. During that time, Bernadett Szél was nominated the party's candidate to the position of prime minister for the upcoming parliamentary election. In December 2017, Bernadett Szél and György Gémesi agreed, that the Politics Can Be Different and the New Start ran together in the 2018 Hungarian parliamentary election.

Another decline and cooperation with other opposition parties

In these parliamentary election, LMP won 7.06 per cent of the votes and returned 8 members in the parliament (including one single-member constituency in Budapest). After these elections, internal conflicts led to resignation of Bernadett Szél as party's co-chair. Party's support also declined. For example, the party in 2019 European Parliament election achieved almost identical results as in 2009.

In 2020, the changed its name to the LMP – Hungary's Green Party.

Co-leaders

Election results

National Assembly

European Parliament 

1 In an electoral alliance with the Humanist Party (HP).

See also
List of political parties in Hungary
Ökofeszt

Footnotes

External links
Official website in English
Official website's news feed in English

2009 establishments in Hungary
European Green Party
Global Greens member parties
Green political parties in Hungary
Green liberalism
Opposition to Viktor Orbán
Parties represented in the European Parliament
Political parties established in 2009
Political parties in Hungary
Syncretic political movements